Atotech is an international speciality chemicals and equipment company. It provides chemistry and equipment for companies that manufacture printed circuit boards, IC-substrates and semiconductors; and also provides specialty chemicals and equipment for decorative and functional surface finishing in the automotive, construction, furniture and other industries.

The company has manufacturing, technology centers, and sales and service sites in over 40 countries, including Germany, Czech Republic, Slovenia, Spain, China, Korea, Taiwan, Singapore, India, Japan, USA, Canada, Mexico and Brazil. Its headquarters is in Berlin, Germany.

The company is composed of two main business units: Electronics and General Metal Finishing. Of the over 4,000 employees, approximately 56% are in Asia; 35% are in Europe; and 9% are in the Americas. The company owns approximately 2,300 patents.

Atotech was founded in 1993, when ELFAtochem merged its M&T Harshaw operations with the electroplating division of Schering AG.

Major competitors of Atotech are the US-based companies Element Solutions, DuPont, and the French company Coventya.

As of 2020, the company employed approximately 4,000 employees.

History
Atotech traces its origins to Grüne Apotheke founded in Berlin in 1851 by Ernst Christian Friedrich Schering.

In 1901, the electroplating division was launched. It produced salt mixtures for storing metals with the brand name Trisalyt. In 1927, Chemische Fabrik auf Actien (vorm E. Schering) merged with CAF Kahlbaum Chemische Fabrik GmbH to create Schering-Kahlbaum AG (known as Schering AG after 1937).

In 1936, the electroplating division developed the first “fast” electrolyte – Copper Trisalyt Extra Rapid – as well as the world's first gloss surface bath, called 'Brilliant.' The success of these innovations led to the establishment of the first department for electroplating.

In 1951, Schering AG started its electroplating division in Feucht, Germany, where Atotech had its main equipment production site. In 1989, the electroplating division moved to a new location in Berlin, Germany.

In 1993, Schering AG sold its electroplating division to the French chemical company ELF Atochem. Subsequently, ELFAtochem merged its subsidiary M&T Harshaw with the newly acquired electroplating division from Schering AG and founded Atotech Deutschland GmbH.

The company established factories and service centers in Germany. Later, manufacturing and service networks were launched across Europe, Asia, and subsequently in the Americas.

Currently, Atotech's two core business segments are electronics (printed circuit boards and semi-conductors) and general metal finishing, (for automobiles, construction, furniture and more). The company provides custom-made integrated production systems and local service to its customers worldwide.

At the end of 2016, Atotech was sold by Total to the Carlyle Group.

In March 2017, Geoff Wild was appointed as CEO of Atotech. The company's CFO  is Peter Frauenknecht. John Stephenson heads the operations of the Group as COO.  Josh McMorrow is Group General Counsel for Atotech.

On February 4, 2021, Atotech went public with an IPO on the New York Stock Exchange under the ticker name "ATC".

In July 2021, MKS Instruments agreed to purchase Atotech for $5.1 billion in cash-and stock deal.

Products
Atotech provides specialty chemical processes and equipment for the  
 Printed circuit board industry
 Package substrate industry
 Semiconductor industry
 Decorative and functional surface finishing industry (decorative coatings, corrosion protection coatings, electroless nickel, hard chrome, functional electronic coatings)

References

External links
Official website

Chemical companies of Germany
2021 initial public offerings
Companies listed on the New York Stock Exchange
Manufacturing companies based in Berlin
Chemical companies established in 1993
German companies established in 1993
2021 mergers and acquisitions